In Germany, 1888 is known as the Year of the Three Emperors. Currently, it is the year that, when written in Roman numerals, has the most digits (13). The next year that also has 13 digits is the year 2388. The record will be surpassed as late as 2888, which has 14 digits.

Events

January–March 

 January 3 – The 91-centimeter telescope at Lick Observatory in California is first used.
 January 12 – The Schoolhouse Blizzard hits Dakota Territory, the states of Montana, Minnesota, Nebraska, Kansas, and Texas, leaving 235 dead, many of them children on their way home from school.
 January 13 – The National Geographic Society is founded in Washington, D.C.
 January 21 – The Amateur Athletic Union is founded by William Buckingham Curtis in the United States.
 January 26 –  The Lawn Tennis Association is founded in England.
 February 6 – Gillis Bildt becomes Prime Minister of Sweden (1888–1889).
 February 27 – In West Orange, New Jersey, Thomas Edison meets with Eadweard Muybridge, who proposes a scheme for sound film.
 March 8 – The Agriculture College of Utah (later Utah State University) is founded in Logan, Utah.
 March 9 – Wilhelm I dies, Frederick III becomes German Emperor and King of Prussia.
 March 11 – The Great Blizzard of 1888 begins along the eastern seaboard of the United States, shutting down commerce and killing more than 400.
 March 13 – De Beers Consolidated Mines Ltd. is founded in Kimberley.
 March 15 – The Sikkim Expedition, a British military expedition to expel the Tibetans from northern Sikkim, begins.
 March 16 – The foundation stone for a new National Library of Greece is laid in Athens.
 March 20 – The first Romani language operetta premieres in Moscow, Russia.
 March 23 – A meeting called by William McGregor, to discuss establishment of The Football League, is held in London.
 March 25 – Opening of an international Congress for Women's Rights organized by Susan B. Anthony in Washington, D.C., leading to formation of the International Council of Women, a key event in the international women's movement.

April–June 
 April 3
 London prostitute Emma Elizabeth Smith is brutally attacked by two or three men, dying of her injuries the following day, first of the Whitechapel murders, but probably not a victim of Jack the Ripper.
 The Brighton Beach Hotel in Coney Island (New York) is moved , using six steam locomotives, by civil engineer B. C. Miller, to save it from ocean storms.
 April 6 – The first New Year's Day is observed, of the solar calendar adopted by Siamese King Chulalongkorn, with the 106th anniversary of Bangkok's founding in 1782 as its epoch (reference date).
 April 11 – The Concertgebouw orchestra in Amsterdam is inaugurated.
 April 16 – The German Empire annexes the island of Nauru.
April 18 - Westminster School is founded in Simsbury, Connecticut
 April 21 – The Texas State Capitol building, completed at a cost of $3 million, opens to the public in Austin.
 May 1 – Fort Belknap Indian Reservation is established by the United States Congress.
 May 8 – The International Exhibition of Science, Art and Industry in Kelvingrove Park, Glasgow opens (continues to November).
 May 10 – Nippon Oil Corporation, predecessor of Eneos, a petroleum and gas energy brand in Japan, is founded in Niigata Prefecture.
 May 12 – The North Borneo Chartered Company's territories (including Sabah) become the British protectorate of North Borneo.
 May 13 – In Brazil, the Lei Áurea abolishes the last remnants of slavery.
 May 26 – The comic novel The Diary of a Nobody by brothers George and Weedon Grossmith begins serialization in Punch (London).  
 May 28 – In Glasgow (Scotland), Celtic F.C. plays its first official match, winning 5–2 against Rangers F.C.
 May 30 – Hong Kong's Peak Tram begins operation.
 June 2 – Edward King (bishop of Lincoln) in England is called to account for using ritualistic practices in Anglican worship.
 June 3
 The Kingdom of Sedang is formed, in modern-day Vietnam.
 American writer Ernest Thayer's baseball poem "Casey at the Bat" is first published (under the pen name "Phin") as the last of his humorous contributions to The San Francisco Examiner.
 June 14 – The White Rajahs territories become the British protectorate of Sarawak.
 June 15 – Wilhelm II becomes German Emperor and King of Prussia; 1888 is the Year of the Three Emperors. 
 June 19 – In Chicago, the Republican Convention opens at the Auditorium Building. Benjamin Harrison and Levi P. Morton win the nominations for President and Vice President of the United States, respectively.
 June 29 – Handel's Israel in Egypt is recorded onto wax cylinder at The Crystal Palace in London, the earliest known recording of classical music.
 June 30 – The Marine Biological Association of the United Kingdom opens its laboratory, on Plymouth Hoe.

July–September 

 July 2–27 – London matchgirls strike of 1888: About 200 workers, mainly teenaged girls, strike following the dismissal of three colleagues from the Bryant and May match factory, precipitated by an article on their working conditions published on June 23 by campaigning journalist Annie Besant, and the workers unionise on July 27.
 July 15 – According to Japanese government official confirmed report, A large scale eruption and ash smoke hit around Mount Bandai area, Fukushima Prefecture, Japan, more than 477 people were killed.
 July 25 – Frank Edward McGurrin, a court stenographer from Salt Lake City, Utah, purportedly the only person using touch typing at this time, wins a decisive victory over Louis Traub in a typing contest held in Cincinnati, Ohio. This date can be called the birthday of the touch typing method that is widely used in modern times.
 August 1 – Carl Benz is issued with the world's first driving licence by the Grand Duchy of Baden.
 August 5 – Bertha Benz arrives in Pforzheim having driven  from Mannheim in a car manufactured by her husband Karl Benz, thus completing the first "long-distance" drive in the history of the automobile.
 August 7 – Whitechapel murders: The body of London prostitute Martha Tabram is found, a possible victim of Jack the Ripper.
 August 9
 A fire destroys the Main Building, the heart of Wells College in Aurora, New York, causing a loss of $130,000.
 The Oaths Act permits the oath of allegiance taken to the Sovereign by Members of Parliament (MPs) to be affirmed, rather than sworn to God, thus confirming the ability of atheists to sit in the House of Commons of the United Kingdom.
 August 10 – Dr Friedrich Hermann Wölfert’s motorised airship successfully completes the world’s first engine-driven flight, from Cannstatt to Kornwestheim in Germany.
 August 13 – The Local Government Act, effective from 1889, establishes county councils and county borough councils in England and Wales, redraws some county boundaries, and gives women the vote in local elections. It also declares that "bicycles, tricycles, velocipedes, and other similar machines" be carriages within the meaning of the Highway Acts (which remains the case), and requires that they give audible warning when overtaking "any cart or carriage, or any horse, mule, or other beast of burden, or any foot passenger", a rule abolished in 1930.
 August 20 – A mutiny at Dufile, Equatoria, results in the imprisonment of the Emin Pasha.
 August 22 – Earliest evidence of a death and injury by a meteorite in Sulaymaniyah, Iraq.
 August 24 –The first trams in Tallinn (Reval), horsecars, begin operation.
 August 28 – The longest date in Roman numerals (XXVIII-VIII-MDCCCLXXXVIII) occurs.
 August 31 – Whitechapel murders: The mutilated body of London prostitute Mary Ann Nichols is found; she is considered the first victim of Jack the Ripper.
  September 4
 In the United States, George Eastman registers the trademark Kodak, and receives a patent for his camera, which uses roll film.
 Mohandas Gandhi embarks on the S.S. Clyde from Bombay for London.
 September 6 – Charles Turner becomes the first bowler in cricket to take 250 wickets in an English season – a feat since accomplished only by Tom Richardson (twice), J. T. Hearne, Wilfred Rhodes (twice) and Tich Freeman (six times).
 September 8
 The Great Herding begins with thousands of sheep beeng herded from the Argentine outpost of Fortín Conesa to Santa Cruz near the Strait of Magellan.
 Whitechapel murders: The mutilated body of London prostitute Annie Chapman is found (considered to be the second victim of Jack the Ripper).
 In England, the first six Football League matches are played.
 In a letter accepting renomination as President of the United States, Grover Cleveland declares the Chinese "impossible of assimilation with our people and dangerous to our peace and welfare".
 September 17 – Las Cruces College (later New Mexico State University) is founded in Las Cruces, New Mexico.
 September 27
 Whitechapel murders: The 'Dear Boss letter' signed "Jack the Ripper", the first time the name is used, is received by London's Central News Agency.
 Stanley Park is officially opened by Vancouver (B.C.) mayor David Oppenheimer. 
 September 30 – Whitechapel murders: The bodies of London prostitutes Elizabeth Stride and Catherine Eddowes, the latter mutilated, are found. They are generally considered Jack the Ripper's third and fourth victims, respectively.

October–December 
 October 1 – Sofia University officially opens, becoming the first university in liberated Bulgaria.
 October 2 – The Whitehall Mystery: Dismembered remains of a woman's body are discovered at three central London locations, one being the construction site of the police headquarters at New Scotland Yard.
 October 9 – The Washington Monument officially opens to the general public in Washington, D.C.
 October 14
 Louis Le Prince films the first motion picture: Roundhay Garden Scene in Roundhay, Leeds, West Yorkshire, England, two seconds and 18 frames in length (followed by his movie Leeds Bridge and Accordian Player).
 Battle of Guté Dili: Seeking to extend Mahdist control over what is now southwestern Ethiopia, governor Khalil al-Khuzani is routed by an alliance of Shewan forces, under Ras Gobana Dacche and Moroda Bekere, ruler of Leqa Naqamte. Only a handful, including Khalil, barely manage to flee the battlefield.
 October 25 – St Cuthbert's Society at the University of Durham in England is founded, after a general meeting chaired by the Reverend Hastings Rashdall.
 October 30 – The Rudd Concession, a written concession for exclusive mining rights in Matabeleland, Mashonaland and adjoining territories, is granted by King Lobengula of Matabeleland to Charles Rudd, James Rochfort Maguire and Francis Thompson, who are acting on behalf of South African-based politician and businessman Cecil Rhodes, providing a basis for white settlement of Rhodesia.
 November 6 – 1888 United States presidential election: Democratic Party incumbent Grover Cleveland wins the popular vote, but loses the Electoral College vote to Republican challenger Benjamin Harrison, therefore losing the election.
 November 8 – Joseph Assheton Fincher files a patent in the United Kingdom for the parlour game which he calls "Tiddledy-Winks".
 November 9 – Whitechapel murders: The mutilated body of London prostitute Mary Jane Kelly is found. She is considered to be the fifth, and last, of Jack the Ripper's victims. A number of similar murders in England follow, but the police attribute them to copy-cat killers.
 November 16 – First signs of famine in Ethiopia, caused by drought combined with early spread of the 1890s African rinderpest epizootic.
 November 20 – The first St V parade by students is held in Brussels.
 November 27 – International sorority Delta Delta Delta is founded at Boston University in the United States.
 November 29 – The celebration of Thanksgiving (United States) and the first day of Hanukkah coincide.
 December 7 – John Boyd Dunlop patents the pneumatic bicycle tyre in the United Kingdom.
 December 17 – The Lyric Theatre (London) opens.
 December 18 – Richard Wetherill and his brother-in-law discover the Indian ruins of Mesa Verde in southwestern Colorado.
 December 23 – During a bout of mental illness (and having quarreled with his friend Paul Gauguin), Dutch painter Vincent van Gogh infamously cuts off the lower part of his own left ear, taking it to a brothel, and is removed to the local hospital in Arles.

Date unknown 
 The dolphin Pelorus Jack is first sighted in Cook Strait, New Zealand.
 The Camborne School of Mines is founded in Cornwall, England.
 John Robert Gregg first publishes Gregg shorthand in the United States.
 Rudyard Kipling's short story collection Plain Tales from the Hills is published in Calcutta, India.
 The Finnish epic Kalevala is published for the first time in the English language, by American linguist John Martin Crawford.
 The Baldwin School is founded in Bryn Mawr, Pennsylvania, as "Miss [Florence] Baldwin's School for Girls, Preparatory for Bryn Mawr College".
 Chin Gee Hee starts the Quong Tuck Company to supply construction workers to North American railroads.
 Global pharmaceutical and health care brands are founded in the United States:
 G.D. Searle by Gideon Daniel Searle in Omaha, Nebraska.
 Abbott Laboratories as Abbott Alkaloidal by Dr. Wallace C. Abbott in Illinois.
 Katz's Delicatessen is founded in the Lower East Side of Manhattan.
 First British rugby union tour of Australia and New Zealand.

Births

January–February 

 January 1 – Victor Goldschmidt, Swiss geochemist (d. 1947)
 January 8 – Matt Moore, Irish-born actor (d. 1960)
 January 16 – Robert Henry English, American admiral (d. 1943)
 January 18 – Thomas Sopwith, English aviation pioneer, yachtsman (d. 1989)
 January 19 – Millard Harmon, American general (d. 1945)
 c. January 20 – Huddie William Ledbetter (Lead Belly), American folk, blues singer (d. 1949)
 January 22 – Carlos Quintanilla , 37th President of Bolivia (d. 1964)
 January 23 – Aritomo Gotō, Japanese admiral (d. 1942)
 January 24
 Vicki Baum, Austrian writer (d. 1960)
 Ernst Heinkel, German aircraft designer (d. 1958)
 January 29 – Wellington Koo, Chinese statesman (d. 1985)
 February 2 – Frederick Lane, Australian swimmer (d. 1969)
 February 5 – Bruce Fraser, British admiral (d. 1981)
 February 8 – Edith Evans, British actress (d. 1976)
 February 11 – John Warren Davis, American educator, college administrator, and civil rights leader (d. 1980)
 February 13 – Georgios Papandreou, Prime Minister of Greece (d. 1968)
 February 14 – Chandrashekhar Agashe, Indian industrialist (d. 1956)
 February 17 – Otto Stern, German physicist, Nobel Prize laureate (d. 1969)
 February 19
 Adelina Domingues, World's oldest person American supercentenarian, last surviving person born in 1888 (d. 2002)
 Tom Phillips, British admiral (d. 1941)
 Aurora Quezon, First Lady of the Philippines (d. 1949)
 José Eustasio Rivera, Colombian writer (d. 1928)
 February 20 – Georges Bernanos, French writer (d. 1948)
 February 25 – John Foster Dulles, United States Secretary of State (d. 1959)
 February 27
 Lotte Lehmann, German singer (d. 1976)
 Arthur Schlesinger, Sr., American historian (d. 1965)

March–April 
 March 1 – Ewart Astill, English cricketer (Leicestershire) (d. 1948)
 March 4 – Knute Rockne, American football player, coach (d. 1931)
 March 7
 William L. Laurence, American journalist (d. 1977)
 Claude Roger-Marx, French writer (d. 1977)
 March 10 – Barry Fitzgerald, Irish actor (d. 1961)
 March 16 – Anton Köllisch, German chemist noted for synthesising MDMA (d. 1916)
 March 17 – Paul Ramadier, Prime Minister of France (d. 1961)
 March 26 – Elsa Brändström, Swedish nurse (d. 1948)
 March 28 – Léon Noël, French diplomat, politician and historian (d. 1987)
 March 29
Enea Bossi, Sr., Italian-born American aerospace engineer, aviation pioneer (d. 1963)
James E. Casey, American founder of the United Parcel Service (d. 1983)
 March 30 – Anna Q. Nilsson, Swedish-American silent film star (d. 1974)
 April 1 – Terry de la Mesa Allen, Sr., American general (d. 1969)
 April 2 – Sir Neville Cardus, British cricket, music writer (d. 1975)
 April 3 – Thomas C. Kinkaid, American admiral (d. 1972)
 April 4
 Tris Speaker, American professional baseball player, member of the Baseball Hall of Fame (d. 1958)
 Zdzisław Żygulski, Sr., Polish literary historian (d. 1975)
 April 6
 Hans Richter, German filmmaker (d. 1976)
 Gerhard Ritter, German historian (d. 1967)
 April 12 – Carlos Julio Arosemena Tola, 28th president of Ecuador (d. 1952)
 April 18 – Duffy Lewis, American Major League Baseball player (d. 1979)
 April 26 – Anita Loos, American writer (d. 1981)
 April 27 – Florence La Badie, Canadian actress (d. 1917)

May–June 

 May 8 – Maurice Boyau, French World War I fighter ace (d. 1918)
 May 9 – Francesco Baracca, Italian World War I fighter ace (d. 1918)
 May 10 – Max Steiner, Austrian-American composer (d. 1971)
 May 11
 Irving Berlin, American composer (d. 1989)
 Willis Augustus Lee, American admiral (d. 1945)
 May 13 – Inge Lehmann, Danish seismologist, geophysicist (d. 1993)
 May 17 – Tich Freeman, English cricketer (d. 1965)
 May 18 – William Hood Simpson, American general (d. 1980)
 May 23 – Zack Wheat, American Baseball Hall of Famer (d. 1972)
 May 24 – Stanley Sylvester Alexander Watkins, English talking pictures pioneer
 May 25
Harukichi Hyakutake, Japanese general (d. 1947)
Miles Malleson, English actor (d. 1969)
 May 27 – Louis Durey, French composer (d. 1979)
 May 28 – Kaarel Eenpalu, Prime Minister of Estonia (d. 1942)
 May 31 – Jack Holt, American actor (d. 1951)
 June – David Dougal Williams, English-born painter and art teacher working in Scotland (d. 1944)
 June 3 – Tom Brown, American jazz musician (d. 1958)
 June 5 – Armand Annet, French colonial official (d. 1973)
 June 6 – Pete Wendling, American composer, pianist and piano roll recording artist (d. 1974)
 June 9 – Ida Rentoul Outhwaite, Australian illustrator (d. 1960)
 June 13 – Fernando Pessoa, Portuguese writer (d. 1935)
 June 16 – Peter Stoner, American mathematician, astronomer and Christian apologist (d. 1980)
 June 17 – Heinz Guderian, German general (d. 1954)
 June 21 – Cecil King, New Zealand rugby league footballer (d. 1975)
 June 22
 Milton Allen, Governor of Saint Christopher-Nevis-Anguilla (d. 1981)
 Harold Hitz Burton, American politician, Associate Justice of the Supreme Court of the United States (d. 1964)
 June 23 – F. Ryan Duffy, American judge and politician (d. 1979)
 June 24
 Boshirō Hosogaya, Japanese admiral (d. 1964)
 Gerrit Rietveld, Dutch architect (d. 1964)
 June 27 – Antoinette Perry, New York stage director for whom the Tony Award is named (d. 1946)
 June 29 – Joseph 'Squizzy' Taylor, Australian underworld figure (d. 1927)

July–August 

 July 1 – Ioan Glogojeanu, Romanian general (d. 1941)
 July 5 – Herbert Spencer Gasser, American physiologist, Nobel Prize laureate (d. 1963)
 July 8 – John R. Sinnock, 8th Chief Engraver of the United States Mint (d. 1947)
 July 9 – Wang Yun-wu, Chinese scholar of history and political science (d. 1979)
 July 10 – Giorgio de Chirico, Italian painter (d. 1978)
 July 16
 Percy Kilbride, American actor (d. 1964)
 Frits Zernike, Dutch physicist, Nobel Prize laureate (d. 1966)
 July 17 – Shmuel Yosef Agnon, Israeli writer, Nobel Prize laureate (d. 1970)
 July 20 – Geneve L. A. Shaffer, American realtor, lecturer and author (d. 1976)
 July 22
 Kirk Bryan, American geologist (d. 1950)
 Selman Waksman, Ukrainian-born biochemist, recipient of the Nobel Prize in Physiology or Medicine (d. 1973)
 July 23 – Raymond Chandler, American-born novelist (d. 1959)
 July 25 – Wilhelm Fritz von Roettig, German Waffen SS general (d. 1939)
 August 4 – Syedna Taher Saifuddin, Indian Bohra spiritual leader (d. 1965)
 August 6
 Stephen Galatti, American Field Service director (d. 1964)
 Heinrich Schlusnus, German baritone (d. 1952)
 August 8
 Shōjirō Iida, Japanese general (d. 1980)
 Harold Page, Australian military officer (d. 1942)
 César Vezzani, French opera singer (d. 1951)
 August 9 – Eduard Ritter von Schleich, German fighter ace, air force general (d. 1947)
 August 13
 John Logie Baird, Scottish inventor (d. 1946)
 Gleb W. Derujinsky, Russian-American sculptor (d. 1975)
 August 16
 Armand J. Piron, American jazz musician (d. 1943)
 T. E. Lawrence ("Lawrence of Arabia"), British liaison officer during the Arab Revolt, writer and academic (d. 1935)
 August 17 – Monty Woolley, American actor (d. 1963)
 August 20 – Tôn Đức Thắng, 2nd president of Vietnam (d. 1980)
 August 25 – Allama Mashriqi, Pakistani scholar, politician (d. 1963)
 August 26 – Gustavo R. Vincenti, Maltese architect and developer (d. 1974)
 August 28 – Evadne Price, Australian-British writer, actress and astrologer (d. 1985)
 August 29
 Gunichi Mikawa, Japanese admiral (d. 1981)
 Dina Romano, Italian stage and film actress (d. 1957)

September–October 

 September 4 – Margaret Henley, J. M. Barrie's inspiration for the name "Wendy" in Peter Pan (d. 1894)
 September 5 – Sarvepalli Radhakrishnan, Indian philosopher, politician and 2nd President of India (d. 1975)
 September 6
 Joseph P. Kennedy, Sr., American politician (d. 1969)
 Zeng Junchen, Chinese drug baron (d. 1964)
 September 12 – Maurice Chevalier, French singer and actor (d. 1972)
 September 14 – Thakur Anukulchandra, Indian social reformer and philanthropist (d. 1969)
 September 16
 Frans Eemil Sillanpää, Finnish writer, Nobel Prize laureate (d. 1964)
 W. O. Bentley, English engineer, entrepreneur (d. 1971) 
 September 17 – Michiyo Tsujimura, Japanese agricultural scientist (d. 1969)
 September 18 – Grey Owl, British impostor, writer (d. 1938)
 September 20 – John Painter, American supercentenarian, world's oldest man between 1999 and 2001 (d. 2001)
 September 26
 J. Frank Dobie, American folklorist, journalist (d. 1964)
 T. S. Eliot, British (American-born) poet, Nobel Prize laureate (d. 1965)
 September 28 – Seán Lester, Irish diplomat (d. 1959)
 October 3 – Claud Allister, English actor (d. 1970)
 October 4
Lucy Tayiah Eads, Kaw tribal chief (d. 1961)
Friedrich Olbricht, German general (d. 1944)
 October 6 – Roland Garros, French pilot (killed in action 1918)
 October 8 – Ernst Kretschmer, German psychiatrist (d. 1964)
 October 9 – Nikolai Ivanovich Bukharin, Russian Bolshevik and Soviet politician (d. 1938)
 October 14 – Katherine Mansfield, New Zealand fiction writer (d. 1923)
 October 16
 Radu Băldescu, Romanian general (d. 1953)
 Eugene O'Neill, American playwright, Nobel Prize laureate (d. 1953)
 Paul Popenoe, American eugenicist (d. 1979)
 Mikhail Kaganovich, Soviet politician (d. 1941)
 October 17 – Paul Bernays, Swiss mathematician (d. 1977)
 October 19 – Venkatarama Ramalingam Pillai, Indian freedom fighter and Tamil poet (d. 1972)
 October 20
Emanoil Bârzotescu, Romanian general (d. 1968)
Sadayoshi Tanabe, Japanese academic, bibliographer (d. 2000)
 October 24 – Carlo Bergamini, Italian admiral (d. 1943)
 October 25 – Lester Cuneo, American actor (d. 1925)
 October 28 – Dumitru Carlaonț, Romanian general (d. 1970)
 October 30 – Alan Goodrich Kirk, American admiral (d. 1963)
 October 31 – Hubert Wilkins, Australian explorer of the Arctic (d. 1958)

November–December

 November 1
 George Kenner, German artist, made 110 paintings and drawings during World War I while interned as a prisoner of war (d. 1971)
 Michał Sopoćko, Polish-Lithuanian saint, the Apostle of Divine Mercy (d. 1975)
 Viliami Tungī Mailefihi, 7th Premier of Tonga (d. 1941)
 November 7
 Nestor Makhno, Ukrainian anarcho-communist revolutionary (d. 1934)
 Chandrasekhara Venkata Raman, Indian physicist, Nobel Prize laureate (d. 1970)
 November 9 – Jean Monnet, French political economist, diplomat and a founding father of the European Union (d. 1979)
 November 13 – Philip Francis Nowlan, American science fiction writer, creator of the Buck Rogers character (d. 1940)
 November 14 – Andreas Malandrinos, Greek actor, (d. 1970)
 November 15
 José Raúl Capablanca, Cuban World chess champion (1921–1927) (d. 1942)
 Harald Sverdrup, Norwegian scientist (d. 1957)
 November 16 – Luis Cluzeau Mortet, Uruguayan composer and musician (d. 1957)
 November 23 – Harpo Marx, American comedian (d. 1964)
 November 26 – Francisco Canaro, Uruguayan-born violinist, composer (d. 1964)
 November 24
 Dale Carnegie, American writer, lecturer (d. 1955)
 Cathleen Nesbitt, British actress (d. 1982)
 November 28 – Edgar Church, American comic book collector (d. 1978)
 November 29 – Oswald Rayner, British MI6 agent (d. 1961)
 November 30 – Ralph Hartley, American electronics researcher, inventor (d. 1970)
 December 3 – Rabbi Yitzhak HaLevi Herzog, Polish-born Chief Rabbi of Ireland and Israel (d. 1959)
 December 4
 King Alexander of Yugoslavia (d. 1934)
 Donald B. Beary, American admiral (d. 1966)
 December 6 – Will Hay, British actor, comedian (d. 1949)
 December 7
Joyce Cary, Northern Irish author (d. 1957)
Jinichi Kusaka, Japanese admiral (d. 1972)
 December 16 – Alphonse Juin, French general, Marshal of France (d. 1967)
 December 18
 Dame Gladys Cooper, English actress (d. 1971)
 Robert Moses, American civil engineer, public works director, highway and bridge builder (d. 1981)
 December 19 – Fritz Reiner, Hungarian conductor (d. 1963)
 December 20 – Yitzhak Baer, German-born Israeli historian (d. 1980)
 December 22 – Theodore Stark Wilkinson, American admiral (d. 1946)
 December 26 – Marius Canard, French orientalist (d. 1982)
 December 28 – F. W. Murnau, German film director (d. 1931)

Date unknown 
 Mariano Andreu, Spanish painter (d. 1976)
 Tudorancea Ciurea, Romanian general (d. 1971)
 Traian Cocorăscu, Romanian general (d. 1970)
 Nicolae Costescu, Romanian general (d. 1963)
 Ibrahim Hashem, 3-time prime minister of Jordan (d. 1958)
Virginia Pereira Álvarez, first Venezuelan woman to study medicine in Venezuela (d. 1947)

Deaths

January–June 
 

 January 7 – Golam Ali Chowdhury, Bengali landlord and philanthropist (b. 1824)
 January 19 – Anton de Bary, German biologist (b. 1831)
 January 20 – William Pitt Ballinger, Texas lawyer, southern statesman (b. 1825)
 January 29 – Edward Lear, British artist, writer (b. 1812)
 January 31 – John Bosco, Italian priest, youth worker, educator and founder of the Salesian Society (b. 1815)
 February 3 – Sir Henry Maine, British jurist (b. 1822)
 February 5 – Anton Mauve, Dutch painter (b. 1838)
 February 22 – Anna Kingsford, British women's rights activist (b. 1846)
 February 24 – Seth Kinman, American hunter, settler (b. 1815)
 March 6
 Louisa May Alcott, American novelist (b. 1832)
 Josif Pančić, Serbian botanist (b. 1814)
 March 9 – William I, German Emperor, King of Prussia (b. 1797)
 March 12 – Henry Bergh, founder of the American Society for the Prevention of Cruelty to Animals (b. 1813)
 March 16 – Hippolyte Carnot, French statesman (b. 1801)
 March 23 – Morrison Waite, Chief Justice of the United States (b. 1816)
 March 27 – Francesco Faà di Bruno, Italian mathematician (b. 1825)
 March 29 – Charles-Valentin Alkan, French composer, pianist (b. 1813)
April 4 – Emma Elizabeth Smith, Whitechapel Murders victim (b. 1843)
 April 14 – Emil Czyrniański, Polish chemist (b. 1824)
 April 15 – Matthew Arnold, English poet (b. 1822)
 April 17 – Ephraim George Squier, American archaeologist, newspaper editor (b. 1821)
 April 19 – Thomas Russell Crampton, English engineer (b. 1816)
 May 11 –  Frederick Miller, German-born American brewer and businessman (b. 1824)
 May 15 – Edwin Hamilton Davis, American archaeologist, physician (b. 1811)
 May 19 – Julius Rockwell,  United States politician (b. 1805)
 May 26 – Ascanio Sobrero, Italian chemist (b. 1812)
 June 7 – Edmond Le Bœuf, French general, Marshal of France (b. 1809)
 June 8 – Sir Duncan Cameron, British army general (b. 1808)
 June 15 – Frederick III, German Emperor, King of Prussia (b. 1831)
 June 23  – Edmund Gurney, British psychologist (b. 1847)

July–December 

 July 1 – Maiden of Ludmir, Jewish religious leader (b. 1805)
 July 4 – Theodor Storm, German writer (b. 1817)
 July 9 – Jan Brand, 4th president of the Orange Free State (b. 1823)
 July 20 – Paul Langerhans, German pathologist, biologist (b. 1847)
 August 5 – Philip Sheridan, American general (b. 1831)
 August 7 – Martha Tabram, possible first victim of Jack the Ripper (b. 1849)
 August 9 – Charles Cros, French poet (b. 1842)
 August 16 – John Pemberton, American pharmacist, founder of Coca-Cola (b. 1831)
 August 20 – Henry Richard, Welsh peace campaigner (b. 1812)
 August 23 – Philip Henry Gosse, British scientist (b. 1810)
 August 24 – Rudolf Clausius, German physicist, contributor to thermodynamics (b. 1822)
 August 31 – Mary Ann Nichols, first confirmed victim of Jack the Ripper (b. 1845)
 September 6 – John Lester Wallack, American theater impresario (b. 1820)
 September 8 – Annie Chapman, victim of Jack the Ripper (b. 1841)
 September 11 – Domingo Faustino Sarmiento, Argentine politician, writer, and father of education (b. 1811)
 September 23 – François Achille Bazaine, French general (b. 1811)
 September 24 – Karl von Prantl, German philosopher (b. 1820)
 September 30
 Catherine Eddowes, victim of Jack the Ripper (b. 1842)
 Elizabeth Stride, victim of Jack the Ripper (b. 1843)
 October 16
 Horatio Spafford, American author of the hymn It Is Well With My Soul (b. 1828)
 John Wentworth, Mayor of Chicago (b. 1815)
October 26 - William Thomas Hamilton, American politician (b. 1820)
 November 1 – Nikolay Przhevalsky, Russian explorer (b. 1839)
 November 9 – Mary Jane Kelly, fifth and final confirmed victim of Jack the Ripper (b. 1863)
 November 10 –  George Bingham, 3rd Earl of Lucan, British army officer and aristocrat (b. 1800)
 November 11 – Pedro Ñancúpel, Chilean pirate active in the fjords and channels of Patagonia. He was executed.
 November 17 –  Dora d'Istria, Romanian/Albanian writer and nationalist (b. 1828)
 November 24 – Cicero Price, American commodore (b. 1805)
 December 2 – Namık Kemal, Turkish patriotic poet, social reformer (b. 1840)
 December 3 – Carl Zeiss, German optician, founder of Carl Zeiss AG (b. 1816)
 December 10 – William E. Le Roy, American admiral (b. 1818)
 December 20 – Rose Mylett, Whitechapel murders victim (b. 1859)
 December 24 – Mikhail Loris-Melikov, Russian statesman, general (b. 1826)
 December 31
 Samson Raphael Hirsch, German rabbi (b. 1808)
 John Westcott, American surveyor and politician (b. 1807)

Date unknown

 Caroline Howard Gilman, American author (b. 1794)

References

Bibliography

Further reading and year books
 1888 Annual Cyclopedia (1889) highly detailed coverage of "Political, Military, and Ecclesiastical Affairs; Public Documents; Biography, Statistics, Commerce, Finance, Literature, Science, Agriculture, and Mechanical Industry" for year 1888; massive compilation of facts and primary documents; worldwide coverage; 831 pp

 
Leap years in the Gregorian calendar